Questprobe: Featuring Spider-Man is the second video game in the Questprobe series.

Gameplay
The player takes the role of Spider-Man, with powers including super strength and the ability to climb walls. Unlike previous releases, this game was not limited to simple verb/noun input, and could accept complex sentences.

Plot

Spider-Man begins the game imprisoned in a skyscraper which he must explore. He encounters characters such as Sandman, Hydro-Man, and Ringmaster. The player must solve puzzles and collect gems. He also encounters Madame Web and Lizard.

Development and release
In 1983, Marvel Comics and Adventure International entered an agreement in which Marvel would grant Adventure a ten-year license to create a series of adventure games based on Marvel's characters. The first installment of the series, Questprobe featuring The Hulk, was released on May 1, 1984, and was accompanied by a comic of the same title. In January 1985, developer Scott Adams revealed that he was developing a second Questprobe game with Al Milgrom based on Spider-Man, and disclosed plans to release a new game every three to five months, with a projected total of twelve or thirteen games.

This was the second graphically illustrated adventure in the Questprobe series by Scott Adams. The versions for Spectrum and Commodore 64 had graphics, but the other versions did not. The game comes with a mini-comic to set the scene for the plot.

Reception
Sinclair Programs said "the adventure itself is excellent, with enough puzzles appearing immediately to keep any adventurer involved and intrigued".

Personal Computer Games said "the game is initially somewhat easier than The Hulk, but rapidly becomes very challenging. The White Wizard is currently deeply involved and urges other adventurers to join him".

Home Computing Weekly said: "Classy, but rather over-priced: recommended for masochists and adventure freaks!"

Paul Bond for Your Computer wrote "Spider-man is the second adventure in the Questprobe series, a combination of comics and computer adventure games that allow you to become your favourite Marvel superhero".

Reviews
ASM (Aktueller Software Markt) - Feb, 1986
Commodore User - Aug, 1985
Crash! - Mar, 1985
Commodore Computing International - Mar, 1985
Commodore User - Feb, 1985

References

1984 video games
Adventure International games
Apple II games
Commodore 64 games
DOS games
Dragon 32 games
ZX Spectrum games